Rodney is a local government area in the northernmost part of New Zealand's Auckland Region, governed by the Rodney Local Board and Auckland Council. It currently aligns with the council's Rodney Ward.

The area was part of the Rodney District between 1989 and 2010, and part of Helensville Borough and Rodney County until 1989. Rodney is named from Cape Rodney (opposite Little Barrier Island), which Captain James Cook named on 24 November 1769 after Admiral Sir George Brydges Rodney.

Rodney includes Kawau Island, Kumeu and Huapai, Helensville, Warkworth, Matakana and Wellsford. The Kaipara Harbour is the largest enclosed harbour in the Southern Hemisphere.

The area has a rural economy. Dairy farming, horticulture, winemaking, forestry and tourism are major industries. There are several lifestyle blocks, retirement homes and holiday homes close to Auckland.

The Kaipara Harbour and surrounding area is within the tribal area of Ngāti Whātua o Kaipara, which has five marae in the area.

References